The MIT Abdul Latif Jameel Clinic for Machine Learning in Health (commonly, MIT Jameel Clinic; previously, J-Clinic) is a research center at the Massachusetts Institute of Technology (MIT) in the field of artificial intelligence (AI) and health sciences, including disease detection, drug discovery, and the development of medical devices. The MIT Jameel Clinic also supports the commercialization of solutions through grant funding, and has partnered with pharmaceutical companies, like Takeda and Sanofi, to forge collaborations between research and development functions and MIT researchers.

Co-founded in 2018 by MIT and Community Jameel, the MIT Jameel Clinic is housed in the MIT Schwarzman College of Computing. The mission of the Jameel Clinic is to "revolutionize the prevention, detection, and treatment of disease", and it describes itself as "the epicenter of AI and healthcare at MIT".

History 
On September 17, 2018, the MIT Jameel Clinic was co-founded by MIT and Community Jameel, an organisation of the Jameel family, owners of the Abdul Latif Jameel business. The launch took place at a signing ceremony at MIT with MIT President L. Rafael Reif, and Fady Jameel and Hassan Jameel, then-presidents of Community Jameel. The MIT Jameel Clinic is the fourth major collaboration between MIT and Community Jameel, after the Abdul Latif Jameel Poverty Action Lab, the MIT Abdul Latif Jameel Water and Food Systems Lab, and the MIT Abdul Latif Jameel World Education Lab.

MIT-Takeda Program 
On January 6, 2020, the MIT School of Engineering and Takeda, the pharmaceutical company, announced a new funding program to support research and education in AI and health. The MIT-Takeda Program is housed in the MIT Jameel Clinic. The steering committee for the program is led by Professor Anantha P. Chandrakasan, Dean of the School of Engineering, and Anne Heatherington, senior vice president and head of Data Sciences Institute (DSI) at Takeda.

Discovery of halicin 
On February 19, 2020, the MIT Jameel Clinic's faculty leads for AI and life sciences, Professor Regina Barzilay and Professor James J. Collins, published a paper in Cell confirming the discovery—for the first time by deep learning—of halicin, the first new antibiotic compound for 30 years, which kills over 35 powerful bacteria, including antimicrobial-resistant tuberculosis, the superbug C. difficile, and two of the World Health Organization's top-three most deadly bacteria.

AI Cures initiative 
In 2020, during the COVID-19 pandemic, the MIT Jameel Clinic launched the AI Cures initiative to apply AI techniques to the discovery of effective therapeutics for the disease, and the development of medical devices. The AI Cures initiative is in partnership with the Patrick J. McGovern Foundation, the Defense Advanced Research Projects Agency (DARPA), and the Walter Reed Army Institute of Research (WRAIR).

In September and October 2020, the MIT Jameel Clinic convened two conferences, on data-driven clinical solutions for COVID-19, and on drug discovery.

Audacious Project award 
In June 2020, The Audacious Project (formerly the TED Prize), housed at TED and supported by The Bridgespan Group, selected Professor Collins and an MIT Jameel Clinic team, including Professor Barzilay, for funding. Building on the halicin discovery, the Audacious Project funding will support the MIT Jameel Clinic's response to the antibiotic resistance crisis through the development of new classes of antibiotics to protect patients against some of the world's deadliest bacterial pathogens.

Ragon Institute collaboration 
In July 2021, a gift from Mark Schwartz enabled the MIT Jameel Clinic to partner with the Ragon Institute (a collaboration between Massachusetts General Hospital, Harvard University and MIT) and the MIT Schwarzman College of Computing to create a collaborative initiative for AI and immunology.

Faculty and governance

Leadership 
The MIT Jameel Clinic leadership comprises three faculty leads:

 Professor Regina Barzilay, faculty lead for AI
 Professor James J. Collins, faculty lead for life sciences
 Professor Dimitris Bertsimas, faculty lead for entrepreneurship

The faculty leads are supported by the Jameel Clinic staff, and coordinate with the Dean of the MIT Schwarzman College of Computing, Daniel P. Huttenlocher.

Advisory board 
The MIT Jameel Clinic is supported by an advisory board, chaired by Professor Phil Sharp, winner of the 1993 Nobel Prize in Physiology or Medicine, Institute Professor, former director of the Koch Institute for Integrative Cancer Research and the McGovern Institute for Brain Research, and co-founder of Biogen.

Other members of the advisory board are:

 Noubar Afeyan, managing director and CEO of Flagship Pioneering
 Jay Bradner, president of the Novartis Institutes for BioMedical Research
 Lord Ara Darzi, Paul Hamlyn Chair of Surgery at Imperial College London 
 Anne Heatherington, senior vice president and head of the Data Sciences Institute, Takeda
 Susan Hockfield, president emerita and professor of neuroscience at MIT
 Mathai Mammen, head of research and development at Janssen Pharmaceutical Companies
 Kiran Mazumdar-Shaw, chairman and managing director of Biocon
 Terry Ragon, CEO and owner of InterSystems

Former members of the advisory board include:

 Anantha P. Chandrakasan, dean of the School of Engineering and professor of electrical engineering and computer science at MIT

References 

Massachusetts Institute of Technology